Dayna Tortorici (born 1989) is an American writer. As of 2016, she is the co-editor of the literary magazine n+1.

Career
After graduating from Brown University in 2011, where she wrote for The College Hill Independent, Tortorici joined n+1 as a staff writer and eventually an editor. In addition to her work on the magazine, she co-edited the n+1 essay collection What Was the Hipster?: A Sociological Investigation and edited No Regrets, a 2013 n+1 book in which 13 women discuss literature.

References

External links
 
 n+1
 Longform Podcast #134: Dayna Tortorici (March 15, 2016)

21st-century American writers
American editors
Brown University alumni
Living people
1989 births
21st-century American women writers